CODA is a 2021 coming-of-age comedy-drama film written and directed by Sian Heder. An adaptation of the French-Belgian film La Famille Bélier (2014), it stars Emilia Jones as the titular child of deaf adults (CODA) and the only hearing member of a deaf family, who attempts to help their struggling fishing business while pursuing her desire to be a singer. The film's cast includes Troy Kotsur, Marlee Matlin, Daniel Durant, Eugenio Derbez, and Ferdia Walsh-Peelo in supporting roles. After debuting at the 2021 Sundance Film Festival on January 28, 2021, the film's distribution rights were purchased by Apple Inc.  for a festival-record of $25 million.  It was released in theaters and through the Apple TV+ streaming service on August 13, 2021.

The film garnered awards and nominations in a variety of categories with particular praise for Heder's screenplay and Kotsur's performance as Frank Rossi. CODA won all three categories it was nominated in at the 94th Academy Awards: Best Picture, Best Supporting Actor (Kotsur), and Best Adapted Screenplay (Heder). It is the first Best Picture winner to be distributed via a streaming platform and the first starring a primarily deaf cast. Furthermore, Kotsur became the first male deaf person and second overall deaf performer to win an acting Oscar after his co-star Matlin won for her lead performance in the 1986 film Children of a Lesser God. It won two awards at the 75th British Academy Film Awards for Best Actor in Supporting Role (Kotsur) and Best Adapted Screenplay (Heder), while Jones was nominated for Best Actress in a Leading Role.

At the 33rd Producers Guild of America Awards, CODA won the award for Best Theatrical Motion Picture. Heder received honors for Best Adapted Screenplay at the 74th Writers Guild of America Awards. The film won an award for Outstanding Performance by a Cast in a Motion Picture at the 28th Screen Actors Guild Awards, and Kotsur received the award for Outstanding Performance by a Male Actor in a Supporting Role at the same ceremony. Kotsur was also named Best Supporting Actor at the 27th Critics' Choice Awards. Both the National Board of Review and American Film Institute included CODA in their top 10 films of 2021.

Accolades

See also 
 2021 in film

Notes

References

External links
 

Lists of accolades by film